The winners of the 1998–99 Asian Cup Winners' Cup, the association football competition run by the Asian Football Confederation, are listed below.

First round

West Asia

|}
1 Al Nejmeh withdrew.

East Asia

|}
1 Police SC withdrew. 
2 PIA FC withdrew. 
3 Yangon City Development had been drawn against the representatives of Indonesia, where the 1997/98 season was abandoned and the cup cancelled due to political and economic turmoil in the country.

Second round

West Asia

|}

East Asia

|}
1 Yangon City Development were unable to field a team for the second leg to player illness.

Quarterfinals

West Asia

|}
1 Kazma withdrew.

East Asia

|}

Semifinals

Third place match

Final

References
Asian Cup Winners Cup 1999

Asian Cup Winners' Cup
2
2